In Tibetan cuisine, Samkham Papleg is a fried dough with yak butter or rapeseed oil.

See also
 List of Tibetan dishes

References

Tibetan cuisine